During the 1992–93 English football season, Crystal Palace F.C. competed in the inaugural season of the FA Premier League.

Season summary
A breakaway by the top 22 clubs saw Palace become founder members of the new FA Premier League for the 1992–93 season. However, they would be without the services of another key player – Mark Bright – who was sold to Sheffield Wednesday and the Eagles struggled to score goals without him. They were demoted on goal difference, after Oldham Athletic's 4–3 victory over Southampton. Palace's 49 points from 42 games that season became the joint-highest total of any club ever to have been relegated from the top flight of English football, and remains a Premier League record. Palace's drop prompted the resignation of manager Steve Coppell after nine years at the helm, and he was succeeded by his assistant Alan Smith.

Final league table

Results
Crystal Palace's score comes first

Legend

FA Premier League

FA Cup

League Cup

Players

First-team squad
Squad at end of season

Left club during season

Reserve squad
The following players did not appear for the first team this season.

Notes

References

Crystal Palace F.C. seasons
Crystal Palace